Badia Calavena is a comune (municipality) in the Province of Verona in the state Veneto, located about  west of Venice and about  northeast of Verona. It is part of the Thirteen Communities, a group of villages which historically speak the Cimbrian language.

Twin towns
 Adlkofen, Germany, since 1988

External links
 Official website

References

Cities and towns in Veneto